Woodsy Owl is a national symbol and advertising character for the United States Forest Service with the aim of motivating children to form healthy, lasting relationships with nature. Harold Bell of Western Publishing (and the producer of the Smokey Bear public service announcements), along with Glen Kovar and Chuck Williams, originally created the mascot in 1970 as part of a United States Forest Service campaign to raise awareness of environmental protection. Woodsy Owl has been an integral part of the educational program of the US Forest Service for decades and is particularly active against littering and environmental pollution. Woodsy's original motto was “Give a hoot! Don't pollute” and has since been updated to “Lend a hand—care for the land!"  Together with Smokey Bear, Woodsy Owl has become an American environmental icon who has found its way into pop culture in numerous songs, comics and television appearances.

Woodsy Owl’s name, character, and mottos are protected symbols under Public Law 93-318 as property of the United States, to be managed by the secretary of Agriculture.

Origin
Woodsy Owl was created in 1970 as part of the second US environmental movement. During this phase of growing environmental awareness, Smokey Bear, which has existed since 1944, was increasingly relied on for environmental education. The US Forest Service was concerned that the bear, with the motto of forest fire prevention, could be misused through excessive use. Forest Service officials therefore commissioned the development of a new protagonist and message.

Harold Bell, who had worked as a merchandising agent for Walt Disney, among others, created Woodsy Owl together with Chuck Williams and Glenn Kovar, two employees of the Forest Service and technical consultants for the popular television series Lassie, and its collaborator Betty Hite. The Robin Hood inspired hat Woodsy wears to this day was motivated by a movie item Williams found on the set. Before choosing the owl, a raccoon, rainbow trout, ladybug and moose had been discussed. The decisive factor was the owl's habitat, which includes not only the forest but also urban regions and should therefore also appeal to an urban audience. This is also alluded to by The Ballad of Woodsy Owl, in which it says "Woodsy Owl has got a home on the big branch of a tree / When he looks from left to right, town and forest he can see." the big branch of a tree / If he looks from left to right, he sees town and forest. ”) After successful test marketing in schools, summer camps and church groups, Woodsy Owl was registered as a trademark on August 20, 1970 at the US patent office. USFS employee Rudy Wendelin, who had already played a key role in the design of Smokey Bear, refined the graphic designs of the figure and breathed “personality” into it. 

Woodsy's slogan was officially introduced on September 15, 1971 by Secretary of Agriculture Clifford Hardin. The first Woodsy Owl public service spot was created by U.S. Forest Ranger Chuck Williams, who was the Forest Service's technical consultant for the Lassie TV show which featured a Forest Service Ranger and his family. Williams, along with Bell and Glenn Kovar, also of the U.S. Forest Service, brainstormed the idea for the Woodsy motif name together in Los Angeles, California, in 1970. In 1974, the U.S. Congress passed the Woodsy Owl Act (Public Law 93-318) to protect the character making it a federal crime to reproduce his image or original slogan. 

Despite the documented history of Woodsy Owl's creation, various rival claims to his parentage have emerged over the years. Several individuals have stated that they invented Woodsy Owl as children as part of a nationwide poster contest. The Forest History Society has said that no evidence of such has been provided.

Several songs have been used in conjunction with the Woodsy Owl environmental campaign, including "The Ballad of Woodsy Owl" and "Help Woodsy Spread the Word". Jon "Bermuda" Schwartz, the drummer for "Weird Al" Yankovic, recorded "The Woodsy Owl Song."

For his appearances in commercials that aired in the 1970s and 1980s, Woodsy was voiced by several actors, including Sterling Holloway, Barry Gordon, Dave Kimber, and Frank Welker.

Several other environmentalism-, conservation- or outdoor-themed comics and characters have appeared over the years, including Mark Trail and Smokey Bear. Woodsy Owl appeared as a comic by Gold Key Comics from 1973 to 1976.

See also 
 Johnny Horizon
 Mark Trail
 Smokey Bear

References

External links 

 U.S. Forest Service National Symbols Program
 Remembering Harold Bell, Creator of Woodsy Owl. Peeling Back the Bark, the Forest History Society.

American mascots
Male characters in advertising
Bird mascots
Cartoon mascots
Mascots introduced in 1971
Fictional owls
Public service announcement characters
Public service announcements of the United States
United States Forest Service